Port Allegany School District is a small, rural, public school district located in McKean County and Potter County, Pennsylvania, United States. Geographically, the district is in the north-central-west part of the state. It includes Annin and Liberty Townships and Port Allegany in McKean County and Roulette and Pleasant Valley Townships in Potter County. According to 2000 federal census data, it serves a resident population of 6,344. In 2010, the district's population had decreased to 5,737 people. The offices for the school system are in Port Allegany High School, which is in the borough of Port Allegany.

Port Allegany School District operates two schools: Port Allegany Junior Senior High School and Port Allegany Elementary School. The district is part of the Seneca Highlands Intermediate Unit 9 which provides services for special education students, curriculum development and teacher training.

School activities
Port Allegany School District offers a variety of clubs, activities and an extensive sports program.

Clubs
Computer club, drama club, French club, peer helpers, SADD, Spanish club, academic team and student council.

Music
 Chorus
 Show choir
 Chamber singers
 Drama
 Band
 Marching band

Sports
The District funds:

Boys
Baseball - A
Basketball- A
Cross country - A
Football - A
Golf - AA
Soccer - A
Track and field - AA
Wrestling - AA

Girls
Basketball - A
Cross country - A
Golf - AA
Soccer (fall) - A
Softball - A
Track and field - AA
Volleyball

Junior High School Sports

Boys
Basketball
Cross country
Football
Track and field
Wrestling	

Girls
Basketball
Cross country
Track and field
Volleyball 

According to PIAA directory July 2012

References

External links

School districts in McKean County, Pennsylvania
School districts in Potter County, Pennsylvania